Federation Cup, also known as Bangladesh Federation Cup, is Bangladesh's premier cup competition in men's association football. The competition started in 1980 and is run by the Bangladesh Football Federation which is responsible for all types of competitive matches in the country. The teams from the country's premier league and other clubs compete in the tournament while occasionally Indian sides were invited in the past. Most of the matches are played in the country's main football venue Bangabandhu National Stadium.
The winner of the tournament earn the slot of playing qualifying round of AFC Cup.

Format
A total of 13 teams participate in the final round. Teams are split into 4 groups. Two teams from each group qualify for the knockout rounds.

Cup winners and finalists 
The clubs that were winners and runners-up of the previous tournaments are listed. 
In 1990, 1992, 1993, 1996, 1998, 2004, 2006, 2007 and 2014 no competitions were held.

Statistics by club

Top goalscorers by edition

Sponsorship
The tournament is currently sponsored by Bashundhara Group. Below is a list of sponsors:

See also
Bangladesh Football Federation
Bangladesh Premier League
Independence Cup
Bangladesh Championship League
Super Cup
List of Bangladeshi football champions
Football in Bangladesh

References

  
1
National association football league cups